The Peru International is an open international badminton tournament in Peru. It was the highest international championships in Peru. The tournament has been an International Challenge level since 2009. Another tournament named Peru International Series for the second grade tournament in Peru which was established in 2015.

Previous winners

Performances by nation

References 

Badminton tournaments in Peru
Sports competitions in Peru